Boris Becker was the defending champion but lost in the third round to Jan Gunnarsson.

Ivan Lendl won in the final 7–5, 6–0, 6–3 against Magnus Gustafsson.

Seeds
All sixteen seeds received a bye to the second round.

Draw

Key

Finals

Top half

Section 1

Section 2

Bottom half

Section 3

Section 4

External links
 1989 Stockholm Open draw

Singles